Hemmelsdorfer See is a lake in Eastern Schleswig-Holstein, Germany. At an elevation of -0.10 m, its surface area is 4.48 km².

External links 
 

Lakes of Schleswig-Holstein
Bay of Lübeck